Events in the year 1990 in Turkey.

Parliament
18th Parliament of Turkey

Incumbents
President – Turgut Özal
Prime Minister – Yıldırım Akbulut
Leader of the opposition – Erdal İnönü

Ruling party and the main opposition
 Ruling party – Motherland Party (ANAP) 
 Main opposition – Social Democratic Populist Party (SHP)

Cabinet
47th government of Turkey

Events

January 
 12 January – Pegasus Airlines, low-cost carrier founded.

May 
 1 May – May Day events result in 1,100 arrests.
 17 May – Democratic Center Party of Bedrettin Dalan established.
 20 May – Beşiktaş wins the championship

June 
 4 June – Turkish United Communist Party founded.
 7 June – People's Toiling Party founded.

August 
 8 August – In the aftermath of the Invasion of Kuwait, Turkey closes the pipeline carrying Iraqi oil to the Mediterranean.

September 
 18 September – Turkey and the United States extend their Defense and Economic Cooperation Agreement.

October 
 21 October – Census (population 56,473,005)

November 
 19 November – Turkey reduces its conventional forces in Europe as the Cold War draws to a close.

December 
 3 December – Chief of general staff General Necip Torumtay resigns.
 5 December – Parliament votes to establish Parliamentary Human Rights Commission.
 19 December – Government asks NATO for military assistance along the border with Iraq.

Births
14 February – Sefa Yılmaz, footballer
17 March – Merve Aydın, middle-distance runner
3 May – Burcu Ayhan, high jumper
16 July – Büşra Cansu, volleyball player
21 November – Bülent Uzun, footballer

Deaths
9 January – Cemal Süreya (born in 1931), poet 
31 January – Muammer Aksoy (born in 1917), academic (assassinated)
7 March – Çetin Emeç (born in 1935), journalist (assassinated)
20 August – Ayla Dikmen (born in 1944), singer
4 September – Turan Dursun (born in 1934), author, theologist (assassinated)
6 October – Bahriye Üçok (born 1919), academic, politician (assassinated)
3 November – Kenan Erim (born in 1929), archaeologist
11 November – Sadi Irmak (born in 1904), MD and prime minister (38th government of Turkey)
24 November – Bülent Arel (born in 1919), musician (electronic)

Gallery

See also
1989–90 1.Lig
Turkey in the Eurovision Song Contest 1990

References

 
Years of the 20th century in Turkey
Turkey
Turkey
Turkey